Curran Hall, also known as the Walters-Curran-Bell House, is a historic house at 615 East Capitol Street in Little Rock, Arkansas.  It was built in 1842 for Colonel Ebenezer Walters.  The single story house is built in the Greek Revival style with Doric pilasters at the entrance way.  Two auxiliary buildings, constructed at about the same time as the main building, were moved and attached to the rear of the house in 1891.

The house is significant as one of the few remaining antebellum era landmarks in Little Rock.  It served as the home of pre-Civil war Arkansas Supreme Court Justice George Watkins. Jacob Frolich purchased the home after the war, who would become a post-reconstruction Arkansas Secretary of State. Before that, however, Frolich, an opponent of the reconstruction Arkansas government and fearful of reprisals, fortified Curran Hall with trap doors and placed his livestock inside the house at night.  Frolich was indicted for the murder of a reputed informant for the reconstruction government and fled to Canada, but later returned and was acquitted of the charge.

In 1976, the house was added to the National Register of Historic Places.  It was acquired by the City of Little Rock and the Little Rock Advertising and Promotion Commission in 1996, renovated, and opened as an information center in 2002.

See also

National Register of Historic Places listings in Little Rock, Arkansas

References

Houses on the National Register of Historic Places in Arkansas
Greek Revival houses in Arkansas
Houses completed in 1842
Houses in Little Rock, Arkansas
National Register of Historic Places in Little Rock, Arkansas
Historic district contributing properties in Arkansas